Charles Gibbons (born June 1, 1957) is a Canadian abstract artist.

Life
Gibbons was born in Montreal, Quebec and studied architecture, arts, and environmental psychology. He worked as an architect for several years, including apprenticing with Arthur Erickson Architects.

Initially he was influenced by the works of geometric abstractionists such as Sol LeWitt, Kenneth Noland, and Frank Stella. His first exhibition was in Calgary, Alberta featuring his geometric abstractions, while studying Environmental Psychology in the early 1980s. In the mid-1980s while working for Arthur Erickson he was influenced by abstract expressionists such as Mark Rothko, Barnett Newman, Jackson Pollock, and Sam Francis.

His current works are generally characterized as meaningful abstraction with bold contrasting colours. His works have been shown at the Toronto International Art Fair, Fort Myers Alliance for the Arts, Singapore International Contemporary Art Fair, and the Huitai National Art Center in China. He is represented in art collections in Canada, the United States, Japan, China, and Singapore.

Works

Affiliations
Visual Arts Ontario
Alliance for Modern Art

See also
Abstract expressionism
Tachisme
Color field painting
Lyrical Abstraction
Action painting
Art history
Art periods
De Stijl
Geometric abstraction
Hard-edge
History of painting
Abstraction in art

References
Publications
Charles Gibbons: So Far .... by D.R. Humber, 2010 
Spiritual Characters: The Art of Charles Gibbons by Dr. Yawei Cui, 2010
Work in Progress by R.B. Merle, 2006
Organic Geometry by Y. Leung, 2003

Articles
International Artist - Issue 73 June/July 2010 - "An Expression of Life" by Kathy Swift
Canadian Brushstroke Magazine Review- March/April 2008
Art Forum China - Issue #1, 2008 - Review of Huitai National Art Center Group Show
Colour & MO - Jan/Feb 2008 - "Mixtures of Substance and Sense: A Dance of Oriental and Western Art" by Dr. Son
The Gallery - July 2008 - "East West Abstract Painting Exhibition: A Visual Feast"
Beijing Art Review - October 2007 - "Postscript: Beijing"
Art News Canada Review - September 2007 - "Reva Revealed"
Art News Canada Review - November 2006 - "Reva"
The River - Gibbons & Simmons show opens - February 4, 2005

Television
Omni Television - July 21, 2008 - Arts & Culture with Yawei Ciu
Citytv Breakfast Television - November 2005 - Featured Artist

External links
"Studio Gibbons"

1957 births
Living people
Canadian abstract artists
Anglophone Quebec people
Artists from Montreal
Canadian designers
Canadian male painters
20th-century Canadian painters
21st-century Canadian painters
20th-century Canadian male artists
21st-century Canadian male artists